Jalil Zaland (also spelled as Jalil Zoland and Ustad Zoland;  or )  was a veteran singer of Afghanistan's golden music era.  He is also a poet and music composer.

He is the father of Farid Zoland, Shahla Zaland, Soheila Zaland, Wahid Zaland, Mina Zaland, Mirwais Zaland, and Mahmood Zaland. He was one of the early teachers of Ahmad Wali. The Zaland's are Persian speakers, as a result, Jalil Zaland's classic melodies were also highly acclaimed in Iran and Tajikistan. He is also popular for the composition of hit song "Man Amadeam" by Googosh.

References

20th-century Afghan male singers
Afghan composers
1930s births
2009 deaths